Loch Arbour is a village in Monmouth County, in the U.S. state of New Jersey. As of the 2020 United States census, the village's population was 224, an increase of 30 (+15.5%) from the 2010 census count of 194, which in turn reflected a decline of 86 (-30.7%) from the 280 counted in the 2000 census, which had in turn declined by 100 (-26.3%) from the 380 counted in the 1990 Census.

In 2010, Loch Arbour was the third-smallest municipality in New Jersey in terms of area (behind Shrewsbury Township and East Newark) and was the fifth-smallest municipality by population in the state of New Jersey. Based on data from the New Jersey Department of Environmental Protection, the borough is the third-smallest municipality in the state.

History
Loch Arbour was incorporated as a village by an act of the New Jersey Legislature on April 23, 1957, from portions of Ocean Township, based on the results of a referendum held that same day. The borough was named for Lochaber, Scotland.

Its formation was driven by efforts to build beachfront condominiums in the area. Residents who sought to prevent the development led the secession, taking with them the last portion of oceanfront property in what The New York Times described as "the now ironically-named Ocean Township."

In 1997, Loch Arbour voters rejected a ballot proposal that would have it merge back into Ocean Township by an 88–69 margin, and proposals to merge with Allenhurst or Interlaken failed by a nearly 10–1 margin.

A ballot proposal in 2011 again considered a merger with Allenhurst, citing a potential reduction in property taxes for residents. In 2012, Loch Arbour officials held discussions with their counterparts in Allenhurst towards a plan in which the two municipalities would merge, subject to approval by the councils of both communities and approval of a referendum by voters in both Loch Arbour and Allenhurst. The merger drive was driven by property taxes paid to the Ocean Township School District, a relationship that would be ended by the merger, under which the combined municipality would send students at lower cost to the Asbury Park Public Schools.

While there are four municipalities that retain the Village type of government (Loch Arbour, Ridgefield Park, Ridgewood and South Orange), none of them still use the Village form of government. Loch Arbour was the last to do so, but on December 20, 2011, its residents voted to change from having a form with five village trustees to the Walsh Act form of government, under which Loch Arbour is governed by a three-member board of commissioners.

In 1892, James J. Corbett set up his training camp in Loch Arbour for the bout with John L. Sullivan in which Corbett won the world heavyweight boxing championship.

Geography
According to the United States Census Bureau, the village had a total area of 0.13 square miles (0.35 km2), including 0.09 square miles (0.22 km2) of land and 0.05 square miles (0.12 km2) of water (36.15%).

The village is located along the Atlantic Ocean in eastern Monmouth County and is bordered to the north by the Borough of Allenhurst, to the west by the borough of Interlaken and to the south by the City of Asbury Park.

Demographics

2010 census

The Census Bureau's 2006–2010 American Community Survey showed that (in 2010 inflation-adjusted dollars) median household income was $120,000 (with a margin of error of +/− $62,957) and the median family income was $119,167 (+/− $20,917). Males had a median income of $73,500 (+/− $27,181) versus $92,500 (+/− $38,683) for females. The per capita income for the borough was $60,575 (+/− $9,229). None of the population were below the poverty line.

2000 census
As of the 2000 United States census there were 280 people, 120 households, and 77 families residing in the village. The population density was 2,894.0 people per square mile (1,081.1/km2). There were 156 housing units at an average density of 1,612.4 per square mile (602.3/km2). The racial makeup of the village was 95.00% White, 2.14% African American, 0.71% Asian, 0.36% from other races, and 1.79% from two or more races. Hispanic or Latino of any race were 0.71% of the population.

There were 120 households, out of which 20.0% had children under the age of 18 living with them, 54.2% were married couples living together, 7.5% had a female householder with no husband present, and 35.8% were non-families. 27.5% of all households were made up of individuals, and 3.3% had someone living alone who was 65 years of age or older. The average household size was 2.33 and the average family size was 2.88.

In the village, the population was spread out, with 17.5% under the age of 18, 6.1% from 18 to 24, 30.0% from 25 to 44, 30.7% from 45 to 64, and 15.7% who were 65 years of age or older. The median age was 43 years. For every 100 females, there were 105.9 males. For every 100 females age 18 and over, there were 102.6 males.

The median income for a household in the village was $68,542, and the median income for a family was $74,250. Males had a median income of $61,964 versus $41,250 for females. The per capita income for the village was $34,037. None of the families and 4.8% of the population were living below the poverty line.

Government

Local government
Since 2011, the Loch Arbour has been governed under the Walsh Act form of government. The village is one of 30 municipalities (of the 564) statewide that use this commission form of government. The governing body is comprised of a Board of Commissioners, whose three members are chosen by the voters at-large on a non-partisan basis to serve concurrent three-year terms of office as part of the May municipal election. At a reorganization meeting held after each election, each commissioner is assigned a department to oversee and administer, and the commissioners select one of their members to serve as mayor and another as deputy mayor. In December 2011, residents voted to switch from the Village form to the current Walsh Act form of government.

, members of Loch Arbour's Board of Trustees are 
Mayor Paul V. Fernicola (Commissioner of Public Affairs and Public Safety), 
Deputy Mayor Alfred J. Cheswick (Commissioner of Revenue and Finance) and 
Denis D'Angelo (Commissioner of Public Works, Public Property and Beaches), all of whom are serving concurrent terms of office ending May 21, 2024.

Federal, state, and county representation
Loch Arbour is located in the 6th Congressional District and is part of New Jersey's 11th state legislative district.

 

Monmouth County is governed by a Board of County Commissioners comprised of five members who are elected at-large to serve three year terms of office on a staggered basis, with either one or two seats up for election each year as part of the November general election. At an annual reorganization meeting held in the beginning of January, the board selects one of its members to serve as Director and another as Deputy Director. , Monmouth County's Commissioners are
Commissioner Director Thomas A. Arnone (R, Neptune City, term as commissioner and as director ends December 31, 2022), 
Commissioner Deputy Director Susan M. Kiley (R, Hazlet Township, term as commissioner ends December 31, 2024; term as deputy commissioner director ends 2022),
Lillian G. Burry (R, Colts Neck Township, 2023),
Nick DiRocco (R, Wall Township, 2022), and 
Ross F. Licitra (R, Marlboro Township, 2023). 
Constitutional officers elected on a countywide basis are
County clerk Christine Giordano Hanlon (R, 2025; Ocean Township), 
Sheriff Shaun Golden (R, 2022; Howell Township) and 
Surrogate Rosemarie D. Peters (R, 2026; Middletown Township).

Politics
As of March 2011, there were a total of 160 registered voters in Loch Arbour, of which 54 (33.8%) were registered as Democrats, 42 (26.3%) were registered as Republicans and 64 (40.0%) were registered as Unaffiliated. There were no voters registered to other parties.

In the 2012 presidential election, Republican Mitt Romney received 56.7% of the vote (68 cast), ahead of Democrat Barack Obama with 42.5% (51 votes), and other candidates with 0.8% (1 vote), among the 121 ballots cast by the village's 164 registered voters (1 ballot was spoiled), for a turnout of 73.8%. In the 2008 presidential election, Republican John McCain received 51.4% of the vote (73 cast), ahead of Democrat Barack Obama with 47.2% (67 votes) and other candidates with 1.4% (2 votes), among the 142 ballots cast by the village's 186 registered voters, for a turnout of 76.3%. In the 2004 presidential election, Republican George W. Bush received 57.6% of the vote (106 ballots cast), outpolling Democrat John Kerry with 40.2% (74 votes) and other candidates with 0.9% (2 votes), among the 184 ballots cast by the village's 231 registered voters, for a turnout percentage of 79.7.

In the 2013 gubernatorial election, Republican Chris Christie received 65.1% of the vote (54 cast), ahead of Democrat Barbara Buono with 33.7% (28 votes), and other candidates with 1.2% (1 vote), among the 85 ballots cast by the village's 166 registered voters (2 ballots were spoiled), for a turnout of 51.2%. In the 2009 gubernatorial election, Republican Chris Christie received 62.0% of the vote (75 ballots cast), ahead of  Democrat Jon Corzine with 24.8% (30 votes), Independent Chris Daggett with 11.6% (14 votes) and other candidates with 0.8% (1 votes), among the 121 ballots cast by the village's 168 registered voters, yielding a 72.0% turnout.

Education
Since the 1960s, Loch Arbour had been a part of the Ocean Township School District, a consolidated public school district serving students in kindergarten through twelfth grade from both Loch Arbour and Ocean Township.

At the end of the 2016–2017 school year, Loch Arbour left the Ocean Township district after getting approval from the New Jersey Department of Education and the approval of a referendum by over 95% of voters. With 14 public school students and school property taxes of $2 million, Loch Arbour had been paying an average of $143,000 per pupil under the old arrangement, while Ocean Township residents paid only $16,000 per pupil. Under new sending/receiving relationships established with the West Long Branch district for Pre-K–8 and Shore Regional for 9–12, Loch Arbour pays tuition to each district based on the number of students.

The West Long Branch Public Schools serves students in pre-kindergarten through eighth grade from West Long Branch. Students from Allenhurst and Interlaken also attend the district's school as part of sending/receiving relationships, in which students attend on a tuition basis. As of the 2018–019 school year, the district, comprised of two schools, had an enrollment of 573 students and 62.4 classroom teachers (on an FTE basis), for a student–teacher ratio of 9.2:1. Schools in the district (with 2018–19 enrollment data from the National Center for Education Statistics) are 
Betty McElmon Elementary School with 310 students in pre-Kindergarten through fourth grade and 
Frank Antonides School with 256 students in fifth through eighth grades.

For ninth through twelfth grades, public school students attend Shore Regional High School, a regional high school located in West Long Branch that also serves students from the constituent districts of Monmouth Beach, Oceanport and Sea Bright. The high school is part of the Shore Regional High School District. As of the 2018–19 school year, the high school had an enrollment of 649 students and 57.2 classroom teachers (on an FTE basis), for a student–teacher ratio of 11.3:1.

Transportation

Roads and highways

Route 71 is the main access road that passes north–south through the village.

Loch Arbour is one hour south of New York City and east of Philadelphia. The closest limited access road is Route 18, and both Interstate 195 and the Garden State Parkway are at least 15 minutes away.

Public transportation
, NJ Transit served the village on the 837 (New Jersey bus) route.

The NJ Transit Jersey Shore Line passes through the village, with the closest stop at Allenhurst station in neighboring Allenhurst, New Jersey.

Climate

According to the Köppen climate classification system, Loch Arbour has a humid subtropical climate (Cfa). Cfa climates are characterized by all months having an average temperature > , at least four months with an average temperature ≥ , at least one month with an average temperature ≥  and no significant precipitation difference between seasons. Although most summer days are slightly humid with a cooling afternoon sea breeze in Loch Arbour, episodes of heat and high humidity can occur with heat index values > . July is the peak in thunderstorm activity and the average wettest month is August. Episodes of extreme cold and wind can occur with wind chill values < .

Ecology
According to the A. W. Kuchler U.S. potential natural vegetation types, Loch Arbour would have a dominant vegetation type of Appalachian Oak (104) with a dominant vegetation form of Eastern Hardwood Forest (25). The average date of first spring leaf-out is March 24 and fall color typically peaks in early-November.

Notable people

People who were born in, residents of, or otherwise closely associated with Loch Arbour include:

 Peter Dobson (born 1964), actor with a cameo role in Forrest Gump as Elvis Presley
 Radia Perlman (born 1951), inventor of the Spanning Tree Protocol
 Alfred and Rosemary Podgis, murdered in their Loch Arbour home in 1982

References

External links

 Loch Arbour Village website
 West Long Branch Public Schools
 
 West Long Branch Public Schools, National Center for Education Statistics
 Shore Regional High School

 
1957 establishments in New Jersey
Jersey Shore communities in Monmouth County
Populated places established in 1957
Villages in Monmouth County, New Jersey